Annie Ware Sabine Siebert (1864-1947) was an American painter known for her miniature paintings.

Early life
Annie Sabine was born in 1864 in Cambridge, Massachusetts to Hylas Sabine, a politician, and Annie Ware Sabine. She grew up in Marysville, Ohio and Richwood, Ohio. Her brother was Wallace Clement Sabine.

She studied at the Ohio State University, where she earned her first degree in 1884 and was the first woman to earn a master of arts degree in 1886. She went on study at the Massachusetts Institute of Technology, where she was the first woman to earn an architecture degree in 1888. She also studied art at Harvard University.

Career
She was a member of the Pennsylvania Society of Miniature Painters and exhibited her work at the 1933 Century of Progress World's Fair.

Some of her subjects included:
 Charles W. Eliot
 Washington Gladden
 William Scarlett
 S.C. Derby

Personal life
On August 16, 1893, she married Wilbur Henry Siebert. She had a foster son, John F. Marshall, and a foster daughter, Mrs. Willie L. Howie.

She died on November 7, 1947 at the Ohio State University Wexner Medical Center in Columbus, Ohio of a coronary occlusion.

Legacy
In 1958 a women's residence hall at Ohio State University was named "Siebert Hall" in her honor.

References

External links

1864 births
1947 deaths
19th-century American women artists
20th-century American women artists
People from Cambridge, Massachusetts
Artists from Massachusetts
Ohio State University alumni
MIT School of Architecture and Planning alumni
Harvard University alumni